Meldal is a village and former municipality. It is now part of the municipality of Orkland in Trøndelag county, Norway. Prior to the creation of the Orkland municipality it was the administrative centre of the Meldal municipality. The village is located in the Orkdalen valley, along the river Orkla.

The village is the site of a school and preschool, and Meldal Church. There are many popular areas for outdoor activities in Meldal or close by, and there are more than 1,300 holiday cabins in the area.

Agriculture is the main industry in Meldal.

Name
The Old Norse form of the name was Meðaldalr. The first element is meðal which means "middle" and the last element is dalr which means "valley" or "dale". The municipality is named this probably because it is located in the middle of the Orkdalen valley.  The name was historically spelled Meldalen.

Notable  meldalinger
Notable people that were born or lived in Meldal include:
Edvarda Lie (1910–1963), artist
Jan Egil Storholt (born 1949), speed skater and Olympic champion

References

Villages in Trøndelag
Melhus